TSS Cambria was a twin screw steamer passenger vessel operated by the London and North Western Railway from 1921 to 1923, and the London, Midland and Scottish Railway from 1923 to 1948.

History

She was built by William Denny and Brothers of Dumbarton and launched in 1920, but she did not come into service with the London and North Western Railway until 1921.

In 1948 she was renamed TSS Cambria II in preparation for a new vessel of the same name, the motor vessel Cambria and the following year she was scrapped by the British Transport Commission.

References

1920 ships
Ships built on the River Clyde
Passenger ships of the United Kingdom
Ships of the London and North Western Railway
Steamships of the United Kingdom